The Soyuz programme (meaning "Union") is a human spaceflight programme initiated by the Soviet Union in the early 1960s. The Soyuz spacecraft was originally part of a Moon landing project intended to put a Soviet cosmonaut on the Moon. It was the third Soviet human spaceflight programme after the Vostok (1961–1963) and Voskhod (1964–1965) programmes.

The programme consists of the Soyuz capsule and the Soyuz rocket and is now the responsibility of the Russian Roscosmos. After the retirement of the Space Shuttle in 2011, Soyuz was the only way for humans to get to the International Space Station (ISS) until 30 May 2020, when Crew Dragon flew to the ISS for the first time with astronauts.

Soyuz rocket

The launch vehicles used in the Soyuz expendable launch system are manufactured at the Progress State Research and Production Rocket Space Center (TsSKB-Progress) in Samara, Russia. As well as being used in the Soyuz programme as the launcher for the crewed Soyuz spacecraft, Soyuz launch vehicles are now also used to launch robotic Progress supply spacecraft to the International Space Station and commercial launches marketed and operated by TsSKB-Progress and the Starsem company. Currently Soyuz vehicles are launched from the Baikonur Cosmodrome in Kazakhstan and the Plesetsk Cosmodrome in northwest Russia and, since 2011, Soyuz launch vehicles are also being launched from the Guiana Space Centre in French Guiana. The Spaceport's new Soyuz launch site has been handling Soyuz launches since 21 October 2011, the date of the first launch. As of December 2019, 19 Guiana Soyuz launches had been made from French Guiana Space Centre, all successful.

Soyuz spacecraft

The basic Soyuz spacecraft design was the basis for many projects, many of which were never developed. Its earliest form was intended to travel to the Moon without employing a huge booster like the Saturn V or the Soviet N-1 by repeatedly docking with upper stages that had been put in orbit using the same rocket as the Soyuz. This and the initial civilian designs were done under the Soviet Chief Designer Sergei Pavlovich Korolev, who did not live to see the craft take flight. Several military derivatives took precedence in the Soviet design process, though they never came to pass.

A Soyuz spacecraft consists of three parts (from front to back):
a spheroid orbital module
a small aerodynamic reentry module
a cylindrical service module with solar panels attached

There have been many variants of the Soyuz spacecraft, including:
 Sever early crewed spacecraft proposal to replace Vostok (1959) 
L1-1960 crewed circumlunar spacecraft proposal (1960); evolved into the Soyuz-A design
L4-1960 crewed lunar orbiter proposal (1960)
L1-1962 crewed lunar flyby spacecraft proposal (1962); early design led to Soyuz
OS-1962 space station proposal (1962)
 Soyuz-A 7K-9K-11K circumlunar complex proposal (1963)
 Soyuz 7K crewed spacecraft concept
 Soyuz 9K proposed booster
 Soyuz 11K proposed fuel tanker
 L3-1963 crewed lunar lander proposal (1963)
 L4-1963 crewed lunar orbiter proposal; modified 7K (1963)
 Soyuz 7K-OK (1967–1970)
 Soyuz 7K-L1 Zond (1967–1970)
 Soyuz 7K-L3 LOK (1971–1972)
 Soyuz 7K-OKS (1971); also known as 7KT-OK
 Soyuz 7K-T or "ferry" (1973–1981)
 Soyuz 7K-T/A9 (1974–1978)
 Soyuz 7K-TM (1974–1976)
 7K-MF6 (1976)
 Soyuz-T (1976–1986)
 Zarya planned 'Super Soyuz' replacement for Soyuz and Progress (1985)
 Alpha Lifeboat rescue spacecraft based on Zarya (1995); cancelled in favor of a modified Soyuz TM
 Big Soyuz enlarged version of Soyuz reentry vehicle (2008)
 Soyuz-TM (1986–2003)
 Soyuz TMA (2003–2012)
 Soyuz-ACTS (2006)
 Soyuz TMA-M (2010–2016)
 Soyuz MS (since 2016)
 Military Soyuz (P, PPK, R, 7K-VI Zvezda, and OIS)
 Soyuz P crewed satellite interceptor proposal (1962)
 Soyuz R command-reconnaissance spacecraft proposal (1962)
 Soyuz 7K-TK transport spacecraft proposal for delivering cosmonauts to Soyuz R military stations (1966) 
 Soyuz PPK revised version of Soyuz P (1964)
 Soyuz 7K-VI Zvezda space station proposal (1964) 
 Soyuz-VI crewed combat spacecraft proposal; cancelled in 1965
 Soyuz OIS (1967)
 Soyuz OB-VI space station proposal (1967)
 Soyuz 7K-S military transport proposal (1974)
 Soyuz 7K-ST concept for Soyuz T and TM (1974)

Derivatives
The Zond spacecraft was designed to take a crew around the Moon, but never achieved the required degree of safety or political need. Zond 5 did circle the Moon in September 1968, with two tortoises and other life forms, and returned safely to Earth although in an atmospheric entry which probably would have killed human travelers. 

The Progress series of robotic cargo ships for the Salyut, Mir, and ISS use the engine section, orbital module, automatic navigation, docking mechanism, and overall layout of the Soyuz spacecraft, but are incapable of reentry.

While not a direct derivative, the Chinese Shenzhou spacecraft follows the basic template originally pioneered by Soyuz.

Soyuz crewed flights

 Soviet human spaceflight missions started in 1961 and ended in 1991 with the dissolution of the Soviet Union.
 The Russian human spaceflight missions program started in 1991 and continues to this day. Soyuz crewed missions were the only spacecraft visiting the International Space Station, starting from when the Space Shuttle program ended in 2011, until the launch of Crew Dragon Demo-2 on 30 May 2020. The International Space Station always has at least one Soyuz spacecraft docked at all times for use as an escape craft.

Soyuz uncrewed flights

 Kosmos 133 - launch failure
 Kosmos 140 - reentry damage
 Kosmos 186
 Kosmos 188
 Kosmos 212
 Kosmos 213
 Kosmos 238
 Soyuz 2 - failed to dock
 Kosmos 379
 Kosmos 396
 Kosmos 434
 Kosmos 496
 Kosmos 573
 Kosmos 613
 Kosmos 638
 Kosmos 656
 Kosmos 670
 Kosmos 672
 Kosmos 772 - partial fail
 Soyuz 20
 Kosmos 869
 Kosmos 1001
 Kosmos 1074
 Soyuz T-1
 Soyuz TM-1
 Soyuz MS-14

Gallery

See also

Shenzhou, a Chinese spacecraft influenced by Soyuz
Space Shuttle
Buran (spacecraft)
List of spaceflight-related accidents and incidents

References

 
Human spaceflight programs
Crewed space program of Russia
Crewed space program of the Soviet Union
Projects established in 1963
1963 establishments in the Soviet Union